Raja Muda Nazrin Bridge or Tasik Raban Bridge is the lake bridge in Malaysia. It is located in Lake Raban on Lenggong-Sauk Bypass (Federal Route 76) near Lenggong, Perak. The bridge was named after Raja Muda of Perak, Raja Nazrin Shah. (now Sultan Nazrin Muizuddin Shah of Perak.)

Bridges completed in 2007
Bridges in Perak
Hulu Perak District